Jørgen Weelh (13 August 1922 – 16 June 1993) was a Danish film actor. He appeared in 26 films between 1951 and 1990. He was born in Copenhagen, Denmark and died in Denmark.

Selected filmography
 Me and My Kid Brother and Doggie (1969)
 Mig og min lillebror og storsmuglerne (1968)
 Don Olsen kommer til byen (1964)
 The Last Winter (1960)
 Tag til marked i Fjordby (1957)
 Som sendt fra himlen (1951)

External links

1922 births
1993 deaths
Danish male film actors
Male actors from Copenhagen
20th-century Danish male actors